General Lane may refer to:

Barry Lane (British Army officer) (born 1932), British Army major general
James Henry Lane (Confederate general) (1833–1907), Confederate States Army brigadier general
James Henry Lane (Union general) (1814–1866), Union Army brigadier general
Joseph Lane (1801–1881), U.S. Army brigadier general
Reginald J. Lane (1920–2003), Royal Canadian Air Force lieutenant general
Ronald Lane (1847–1937), British Army major general
Sam Lane (comics), fictional U.S. Army general in DC Comics media
Walter P. Lane (1817–1892), Confederate States Army major general

See also
Attorney General Lane (disambiguation)